Guido Cappellini (born 7 September 1959 in Mariano Comense) is an Italian motorboat racer and the most successful driver of all time in the F1 Powerboat World Championship, with ten world titles. He has also raced in other classes of boat racing, notably the Class 1 offshore championship, since his retirement from Formula 1 at the end of 2009.

Career
Cappellini began his motorsport career not in a boat, but on four wheels, racing in karts. In 1981 he won the 135cc Italian Championship, and repeated the feat in 1982, alongside victory in the 135cc European Championship as well. During 1982, Cappellini was given the chance to try out a Dallara-Toyota Formula 3 car and took pole position in his first race, showing real promise. However, in 1983 he made the switch to boats, and in the 100 Miglia del Lario that year, he took victory in the S850 class. Cappellini also triumphed in the F3 Inshore category at the Six Hours of Paris in 1983, and in 1985 he finished fifth overall in the F3 Inshore World Championship.

FONDA Formula Grand Prix
Making his debut in the Formula Grand Prix series in 1986, Cappellini started off driving a Mercury-engined Molinari hull, and during the year enjoyed a best result of two fourth-place finishes in Hanover and Singapore. Whilst Formula 1 disappeared as a world championship and moved entirely to the United States, Cappellini continued to compete at the top level in Europe with DAC Racing, the factory team of the DAC hull manufacturing business. In 1987, a third place in Miami brought Guido his first ever podium and in 1988 he scored three second-place finishes at Augusta, Dublin and Singapore, ultimately finishing the year fourth overall in the final standings. 1989 would bring Cappellini his first race victory in the series, in Italy, at the race in Como.

Formula 1
Further victories would follow for the Italian in 1990 at Budapest as the Formula Grand Prix series was renamed the Formula 1 World Championship, and in 1991 at Penang. Guido was narrowly beaten to the title in 1992 with a much-improved boat, as fellow Italian Fabrizio Bocca pipped him to the championship. For Cappellini though, things could only improve. From 1993 to 1996 he took four straight F1 drivers' titles, a record that has yet to be matched. Another title would follow in 1999, before Guido once again asserted his dominance over the sport, winning another three championships in a row from 2001 to 2003. During this time Cappellini's main rival was Scott Gilman, and over the following seasons the two would share in the success, with Gillman winning in 2004, Cappellini taking his ninth title, and 50th career victory, in 2005, and then Gillman winning once again in 2006. From this point Cappellini's form began to decline somewhat within the sport, as other drivers came to the fore, such as Sami Seliö and Jay Price. But, determined to secure an unprecedented tenth world title, Cappellini persisted, and secured it in style with an excellent run of form in the second half of the 2009 season, overcoming Seliö, Price, Thani Al Qamzi and early frontrunner Jonas Andersson. With his milestone secure, Cappellini declared he would be retiring from F1, and turned his focus to other classes on the water.

Later life
Following his retirement from F1, Cappellini moved to the Class 1 offshore category and became team manager for the DAC Racing team, which runs boat No.74. Beginning in 2010, Guido has enjoyed moderate success within the class, though for 2013 has stepped aside from driving duties, with Tomaso Polli taking over, due to a dispute over technical regulations, with Cappellini stating that when the rules are even for all the teams, he will gladly re-enter the cockpit.

Racing record

Complete Formula 1 Powerboat World Championship results

 The first 1993 Grand Prix of Abu Dhabi was halted after less than half distance following two separate crashes, one of which claimed the life of John Hill. Half points were awarded.
 The 1999 Grand Prix of Russia was halted after 12 laps with results annulled and no points awarded. 
 The starting grid for the 1999 Grand Prix of Turkey was formed on the basis of current championship standings following the İzmit earthquake, with the race held as planned on Sunday 22 August.
 The 1999 Grand Prix of Austria was stopped after seven laps, with the results taken from the completion of the seventh lap, and no points awarded.
 The 2000 Grand Prix of Bulgaria was declared null and void following drivers' protests after the qualifying session that the course was too narrow and the water too shallow to be safe enough to race on. The race was declared an exhibition race and those drivers who hadn't lodged protests agreed to take part, with no World Championship points awarded.
 The 2004 Grand Prix of Korea was run under the 'match race' format, and the event thus did not count towards the final championship standings and no points were awarded.

Career summary

Class 1 results

See also
Most successful athlete in each sport at the World Championships

References

External links
Official Guido Cappellini Website (in Italian)
Guido Cappellini on Facebook

1959 births
Sportspeople from Como
Italian motorboat racers
Living people
Formula 1 Powerboat drivers